Yevgeni Kulik (born 12 June 1993) is a Russian professional ice hockey defenceman. He is currently playing with Amur Khabarovsk of the Kontinental Hockey League (|KHL).

Playing career
Kulik made his Kontinental Hockey League (KHL) debut playing with HC Spartak Moscow during the 2012–13 KHL season. He has also played with Avangard Omsk and HC Yugra.

Following his sixth season with Spartak after the completion of the 2020-21 season, Kulik left as a free agent and signed a two-year contract with Traktor Chelyabinsk on 4 May 2021.

References

External links

1993 births
Living people
Amur Khabarovsk players
Avangard Omsk players
Ice hockey people from Moscow
Russian ice hockey defencemen
HC Spartak Moscow players
Traktor Chelyabinsk players
HC Yugra players